Ian McCaldon (born 14 September 1974) is a Scottish former football goalkeeper. McCaldon serves as the head goalkeeping coach for Everton Women in Liverpool, England. He oversees scouting, training and game plans for the Everton goalkeepers.  

While a player at Livingston McCaldon helped them reach the semi-finals of the 2000-01 Scottish Cup. When the game came round McCaldon had picked up an injury and Livingston were trying to sign a senior goalkeeper on emergency cover because Javier Sánchez Broto was cup-tied, Neil Alexander was injured and David McEwan was not deemed ready for first team football. However Livi were unable to sign anyone so McCaldon was forced to play with his injury, and they ended up losing 3-0 to Hibernian. 

From 2018 to 2020, McCaldon was the head goalkeeping coach for Washington Spirit in the National Women’s Soccer League. While there he was named 2020 Coach of the Year and marshaled goalkeeper Aubrey Bledsoe to train with the United States Women's National Team.

McCaldon was the head goalkeeping coach for the Scottish Women’s National A Squad, where he traveled extensively, including 77 international games in Europe, the United States, and Brazil. In 2017, McCaldon helped lead the team to the Women’s European Championship Finals.

Prior to that, McCaldon coached goalkeepers at Livingston Football Club, National Performance Center for Female Footballers at Herriott Watt University Edinburgh, and Hibernian Ladies Football Club. 

McCaldon played as a professional goalkeeper for twelve years at Livingston FC, St Mirren, Ross County FC, Peterhead FC, Berwick Rangers FC, Oxford United FC, and Chester City FC. 

He has his SFA Goalkeeping License, UEFA ‘B’ License, is a certified professional trainer and private goalkeeping coach for emerging talent aiming to make college, club or pro teams.

References 
https://www.coachianmccaldon.com/

External links 

 (2003 onwards)

1974 births
Living people
Footballers from Liverpool
English footballers
Association football goalkeepers
Livingston F.C. players
St Mirren F.C. players
Oxford United F.C. players
Chester City F.C. players
Ross County F.C. players
Peterhead F.C. players
Berwick Rangers F.C. players
Scottish Football League players
Scottish Premier League players
English Football League players
National League (English football) players